Chloe Beck and Emma Navarro won the girls' doubles tennis title at the 2019 French Open, defeating Alina Charaeva and Anastasia Tikhonova in the final, 6–1, 6–2.

Caty McNally and Iga Świątek were the defending champions, but chose not to participate.

Seeds

Draw

Finals

Top half

Bottom half

External links 
 Draw

Girls' Doubles
French Open, 2019 Girls' Doubles